Alexiidae is a family of beetles. It contains a single genus, Sphaerosoma, formerly included within the family Cerylonidae, with around 50 species which are native to the western Palearctic. Species of Sphaerosoma are very small, around 1 to 2 mm in length rounded beetles with clubbed antennae. They are fungivores, having been observed feeding on mushrooms, and have been also been found in leaf litter and on decaying bark.

Taxonomy 
There has been considerable confusion regarding the type species and authorship of the genus; most older sources consider the author and species to be Sphaerosoma quercus Samouelle, 1819. That name is now considered to be a nomen nudum, and the valid name for Samouelle's species is Sphaerosoma piliferum (Müller, 1821). The type species is now considered to be Sphaerosoma quercus Stephens, 1832, which is itself a junior synonym of Sphaerosoma pilosum (Panzer, 1793). Alexiidae has been recovered as part of the superfamily Coccinelloidea as the sister group of Latridiidae.

Species

 Sphaerosoma algiricum (Reitter, 1889)
 Sphaerosoma alutaceum (Reitter, 1883)
 Sphaerosoma antennarium Apfelbeck, 1909
 Sphaerosoma apuanum Reitter, 1909
 Sphaerosoma bicome Peyerimhoff, 1917
 Sphaerosoma bosnicum (Reitter, 1885)
 Sphaerosoma carniolicum Apfelbeck, 1915
 Sphaerosoma carpathicum (Reitter, 1883)
 Sphaerosoma circassicum (Reitter, 1888)
 Sphaerosoma clamboides (Reitter, 1888)
 Sphaerosoma compressum (Reitter, 1901)
 Sphaerosoma corcyreum (Reitter, 1883)
 Sphaerosoma csikii Apfelbeck, 1915
 Sphaerosoma diversepunctatum Roubal, 1932
 Sphaerosoma fiorii Ganglbauer, 1899
 Sphaerosoma globosum (Sturm, 1807)
 Sphaerosoma hemisphaericum Ganglbauer, 1899
 Sphaerosoma hispanicum Obenberger, 1917
 Sphaerosoma laevicolle (Reitter, 1883)
 Sphaerosoma latitarse Apfelbeck, 1915
 Sphaerosoma lederi (Reitter, 1888)
 Sphaerosoma leonhardi Apfelbeck, 1915
 Sphaerosoma libani Sahlberg, 1913
 Sphaerosoma maritimum (Reitter, 1904)
 Sphaerosoma merditanum Apfelbeck, 1915
 Sphaerosoma meridionale (Reitter, 1883)
 Sphaerosoma nevadense (Reitter, 1883)
 Sphaerosoma normandi Peyerimhoff, 1917
 Sphaerosoma obscuricorne Obenberger, 1917
 Sphaerosoma obsoletum (Reitter, 1883)
 Sphaerosoma paganetti Obenberger, 1913
 Sphaerosoma piliferum (Müller, 1821)
 Sphaerosoma pilosellum (Reitter, 1877)
 Sphaerosoma pilosissimum (Frivaldszky, 1881)
 Sphaerosoma pilosum (Panzer, 1793)
 Sphaerosoma pubescens (Frivaldszky, 1881)
 Sphaerosoma punctatum (Reitter, 1878)
 Sphaerosoma puncticolle (Reitter, 1883)
 Sphaerosoma purkynei Obenberger, 1917
 Sphaerosoma rambouseki Apfelbeck, 1916
 Sphaerosoma reitteri (Ormay, 1888)
 Sphaerosoma rotundatum Obenberger, 1913
 Sphaerosoma scymnoides (Reitter, 1885)
 Sphaerosoma seidlitzi (Reitter, 1889)
 Sphaerosoma shardaghense Apfelbeck, 1915
 Sphaerosoma solarii Reitter, 1904
 Sphaerosoma sparsum Reitter, 1909
 Sphaerosoma sturanyi Apfelbeck, 1909
 Sphaerosoma subglabrum Peyerimhoff, 1917
 Sphaerosoma sublaeve (Reitter, 1883)
 Sphaerosoma tingitanum Peyerimhoff, 1917
 Sphaerosoma vallambrosae (Reitter, 1885)
 Sphaerosoma winneguthi Apfelbeck, 1915

References

External links
 Alexiidae Tree of Life
 

Coccinelloidea
Polyphaga families
Monogeneric arthropod families